The  (Song of the Fatherland) is a patriotic poem written by Ernst Moritz Arndt in 1812. It is also known by its first line  (The God who made iron grow).

The song was written to denounce the fact that several German states fought on the side of Napoleon to the detriment of their own nation. In 1812, the armies of the Confederation of the Rhine, Austria and Prussia participated in the French invasion of Russia. Many patriots such as Baron von Stein and Ernst Moritz Arndt left Germany and got positions in the Russian state.

With the music of Albert Methfessel (1785–1869), Arndt's  became very popular during the German Campaign of 1813, and remained part of the canon of patriotic songs throughout the 19th and early 20th century.

Lyrics

References

Further reading 
 Friedrich Karl Erlach (ed.): Die Volkslieder der Deutschen. Mannheim, 1834, especially 2nd vol. p. 473–475 (Google)
 Marion Gillum: Politische Musik in der Zeit des Nationalsozialismus. Verlag für Berlin-Brandenburg, Berlin 2000, .
 Kurt Pätzold,  (ed.): Schlagwörter und Schlachtrufe. 2002, p. 63.

German patriotic songs
1812 poems